West Athens  may refer to:
 West Athens (regional unit), Greece
 West Athens, California, US